Sir Christopher Bruce Ricks  (born 18 September 1933) is a British literary critic and scholar. He is the William M. and Sara B. Warren Professor of the Humanities at Boston University (US), co-director of the Editorial Institute at Boston University, and was Professor of Poetry at the University of Oxford (UK) from 2004 to 2009.  In 2008, he served as president of the Association of Literary Scholars and Critics.
He is known as a champion of Victorian poetry; an enthusiast of Bob Dylan, whose lyrics he has analysed at book length; a trenchant reviewer of writers he considers pretentious (Marshall McLuhan, Christopher Norris, Geoffrey Hartman, Stanley Fish); and a warm reviewer of those he thinks humane or humorous (F. R. Leavis, W. K. Wimsatt, Christina Stead). Hugh Kenner praised his "intent eloquence", and Geoffrey Hill his "unrivalled critical intelligence". W. H. Auden described Ricks as "exactly the kind of critic every poet dreams of finding". John Carey calls him the "greatest living critic".

Life
He was born in Beckenham, the younger son of James Bruce Ricks, who worked for the family overcoat manufacturing firm, and Gabrielle (née Roszak), daughter of a furrier of French origin. Ricks was educated at King Alfred's School, Wantage (a near-contemporary of the jockey Lester Piggott), then – as the first of his family to attend university – studied at Balliol College, Oxford, where he graduated with a first in his B.A. in English in 1956, a B.Litt. in 1958, and M.A. in 1960. He served in the Green Howards in the British Army in 1953/4 in Egypt. He was a Fellow and Tutor in English Literature at Worcester College, Oxford, moving in 1968, after a sabbatical year at Stanford University, to become Professor of English at the University of Bristol.

During his time at Bristol he worked on Keats and Embarrassment (1974), in which he made revelatory connections between the letters and the poetry. It was also at Bristol that he first published his still-definitive edition of Tennyson's poetry. In 1975, Ricks moved to the University of Cambridge, where in 1982 he became King Edward VII Professor of English Literature in succession to Frank Kermode, before leaving for Boston University in 1986. In June 2011 it was announced he would join the professoriate of New College of the Humanities, a private college in London.

He was knighted in the 2009 Birthday Honours.

Principles against theory 

Ricks has distinguished himself as a vigorous upholder of traditional principles of reading based on practical criticism. He has opposed the theory-driven hermeneutics of the post-structuralist and postmodernist. This places him outside the post-New Critical literary theory, to which he prefers the Johnsonian principle.

In an important essay, he contrasts principles derived empirically from a close parsing of texts, a tradition whose great exemplar was Samuel Johnson, to the fashionable mode for philosophical critique that deconstructs the "rhetorical" figures of a text and, in doing so, unwittingly disposes of the values and principles underlying the art of criticism itself. "Literature", he argues, "is, among other things, principled rhetoric". The intellectualist bias of professional theorists cannot but make their strenuously philosophical readings of literary texts discontinuous with the subject matter.

Practical criticism is attuned to both the text and the reader's own sensibility, and thus engages in a dialogue between the complex discursive resonances of words in any literary work and the reader's correlative sentiments as they have been informed by a long experience of the self within both the world and literature. In this subtle negotiation between the value-thick sensibility of the reader and the intertextual resonances of a literary work lies the tactful attunement of all great criticism. This school of criticism must remain leery of critical practices that come to the text brandishing categorical, schematic assumptions, any panoply of tacitly assumed precepts external to the practical nature of literary creativity. Otherwise, the risk is one of a theoretical hybris, of a specious detachment that assumes a certain critical superiority to the text and its author. Those theory-saturated critics who engage with texts that, by their nature, are compact of social and political judgements (and much more), assert covertly a privileged innocence, an innocence denied to the text under scrutiny, whose rhetorical biases, and epistemological fault-lines are relentlessly subjected to ostensible "exposure".

Works
A Dissertation Upon English Typographical Founders and Founderies 1778 by Edward Rowe Mores (1961) editor with Harry Carter
Milton's Grand Style (1963)
Poems and Critics (1966) anthology
The Life and Opinions of Tristram Shandy, Gentleman by Laurence Sterne (1967) editor with Graham Petrie
Twentieth Century Views: A. E. Housman (1968) editor
Paradise Lost and Paradise Regained by John Milton (1968) editor
English Poetry and Prose 1540–1674 (1970) editor
English Drama To 1710 (1971) editor
The Brownings: Letters and Poetry (1970) editor
Tennyson (1972)
A Collection of Poems By Alfred Tennyson (1972) editor
Selected Criticism of Matthew Arnold (1972) editor
Keats and Embarrassment (1974)
Geoffrey Hill and the Tongue's Atrocities (1978)
The State of the Language (1979) editor with Leonard Michaels, later edition 1990
The Force of Poetry (1984) essays
The Poems of Tennyson (1987) three volumes, editor
The Tennyson Archive (from 1987) editor with Aidan Day, 31 volumes
The New Oxford Book of Victorian Verse (1987) editor
T. S. Eliot and Prejudice (1988)
A. E. Housman: Collected Poems and Selected Prose (1988) editor
The Faber Book of America (1992) editor with William L. Vance
The Golden Treasury (1991) editor
Beckett's Dying Words (1993)
Essays in Appreciation (1996)
Inventions of the March Hare: Poems, 1909–1917 by T. S. Eliot (1996) editor
The Oxford Book of English Verse (1999) editor
Allusion to the Poets (2002)
Selected Poems of James Henry (2002) editor
Reviewery (2003) essays
Dylan's Visions of Sin (2003)
Decisions and Revisions in T. S. Eliot (2003)
Samuel Menashe: Selected Poems (2005) editor
 True Friendship: Geoffrey Hill, Anthony Hecht and Robert Lowell Under the Sign of Eliot and Pound (2010)
 The Poems of T. S. Eliot (2015) editor with Jim McCue, 2 volumes
 Along Heroic Lines (2021)

Footnotes

External links
Editorial Institute
Profile of Christopher Ricks at Guardian Unlimited
Christopher Ricks Playlist Appearance on WMBR's Dinnertime Sampler  radio show 13 October 2004
 Interviewed by Alan Macfarlane 25 July 2013 (video)

1933 births
Living people
English literary critics
Alumni of Balliol College, Oxford
Fellows of Worcester College, Oxford
Academics of the University of Bristol
Academics of the University of Cambridge
Fellows of the Royal Society of Literature
Stanford University faculty
Boston University faculty
Knights Bachelor
Oxford Professors of Poetry
Fellows of the British Academy
People from Beckenham
King Edward VII Professors of English Literature